Albert Andrew "Ex" Exendine (January 7, 1884 – January 4, 1973) was an American football player, coach, and lawyer. He played college football at the Carlisle Indian Industrial School where he was an All-American end. Exendine served as the head football coach at Otterbein College (1909–1911), Georgetown University (1914–1922), the State College of Washington—now known as Washington State University (1923–1925), Occidental College (1926–1927), Northeastern State Teachers' College—now known as Northeastern State University (1928), and Oklahoma Agricultural and Mechanical College—now known as Oklahoma State University (1934–1935). He was also the head baseball coach at Oklahoma A&M from 1932 to 1933, tallying a mark of 19–13. Exendine was inducted into the College Football Hall of Fame as a player in 1970.

Exendine was born in Indian Territory and played for Pop Warner's Carlisle Indians from 1902 to 1907. Though never having played the game before arriving at the institute, Exendine was named to Walter Camp's third-team All-American team in 1906. Vanderbilt upset Carlisle 4–0 in 1906. Vanderbilt running back Honus Craig called this his hardest game, giving special praise to Exendine as "the fastest end I ever saw."

From 1914 to 1922, Exendine coached at Georgetown and compiled a 55–21–3 record. His tenure there included a 9–1 season in 1916 and an 8–1 season in 1921.  From 1923 to 1925, he coached at Washington State, tallying a mark of 6–13–4. From 1934 to 1935, he coached at Oklahoma A&M, where he compiled a 7–12–1 record.

Exendine earned a law degree at Dickinson School of Law while he was coaching at Georgetown. He later practiced law in Oklahoma and served with the Bureau of Indian Affairs. Exendine died on January 4, 1973, at a hospital in Tulsa, Oklahoma.

Head coaching record

Football

References

External links
 

1884 births
1973 deaths
American football ends
Carlisle Indians football players
Georgetown Hoyas football coaches
Native American players of American football
Northeastern State RiverHawks football coaches
Occidental Tigers football coaches
Oklahoma State Cowboys baseball coaches
Oklahoma State Cowboys football coaches
Otterbein Cardinals football coaches
Washington State Cougars football coaches
All-American college football players
College Football Hall of Fame inductees
Dickinson College alumni
Members of the Society of American Indians
United States Bureau of Indian Affairs personnel
People from Bartlesville, Oklahoma
Coaches of American football from Oklahoma
Players of American football from Oklahoma
Baseball coaches from Oklahoma